A Brewster Chair is a style of turned chair made in mid-17th-century ("Pilgrim Century") New England, United States.

Origin
The "Brewster Chair" was named after Willam Brewster, one of the Pilgrim fathers who landed in Plymouth, Massachusetts in 1620. In 1830 the Brewster family of Duxbury donated Elder Brewster's original chair to Pilgrim Hall Museum in Plymouth, where it remains today.  His chair was created in New England between 1630 and 1660 of American white ash. Other similar New England chairs from the 17th century have been named after this piece.

In the 1970s, Rhode Island sculptor Armand LaMontagne produced a notorious fake Brewster Chair that fooled the national experts at the Henry Ford Museum, which acquired the piece.

Gallery

References

External links
Original Brewster Chair at the Pilgrim Hall Museum
LaMontagne's Fake Chair
"Furniture of the Pilgrim Century" by Wallace Nutting (Marshall Jones: Boston, 1921) pg 182-184 (Google Books search)

Chairs
Massachusetts culture